The 36th New York State Legislature, consisting of the New York State Senate and the New York State Assembly, met from November 3, 1812, to April 13, 1813, during the sixth year of Daniel D. Tompkins's governorship, in Albany.

Background
Under the provisions of the New York Constitution of 1777, amended by the Constitutional Convention of 1801, 32 Senators were elected on general tickets in the four senatorial districts for four-year terms. They were divided into four classes, and every year eight Senate seats came up for election. Assemblymen were elected countywide on general tickets to a one-year term, the whole Assembly being renewed annually.

In 1797, Albany was declared the State capital, and all subsequent Legislatures have been meeting there ever since. In 1799, the Legislature enacted that future Legislatures meet on the last Tuesday of January of each year unless called earlier by the governor.

At this time the politicians were divided into two opposing political parties: the Federalists and the Democratic-Republicans.

Elections
The State election was held from April 28 to 30, 1812. Senator Francis A. Bloodgood (Western D.) was re-elected. Elbert H. Jones (Southern D.), Martin Van Buren (Middle D.), Gerrit Wendell ( Eastern D.), Russell Attwater, Archibald S. Clarke (both Western D.); and Assemblymen Peter W. Radcliff (Southern D.) and Henry Hager (Western D.) were also elected to the Senate. Jones, Radcliff and Wendell were Federalists, the other five were Democratic-Republicans.

On May 28, a caucus of Dem.-Rep. legislators nominated DeWitt Clinton for U.S. president. On June 18, the United States declared War against Great Britain. The Federalists opposed the  war; the Democratic-Republican Party split into two factions: the Clintonians (supporters of DeWitt Clinton and mostly opposed to the war) and the Madisonians (supporters of President James Madison and the war).

In September 1812, State Treasurer David Thomas was arrested in Chenango County on a warrant issued by Supreme Court Justice Ambrose Spencer, and tried before Justice William W. Van Ness, for an attempt to bribe State Senator Casper M. Rouse to vote for the chartering of the Bank of America during the previous session of the Legislature, but was acquitted by the jury. At the same time, Solomon Southwick was tried in Montgomery County before Chief Justice James Kent, for an attempt to bribe Alexander Sheldon, then Speaker of the Assembly, for the same purpose, but was also found not guilty.

Sessions
The Legislature met at the Old State Capitol in Albany on November 3, 1812, to elect presidential electors; and adjourned on November 11.

Jacob R. Van Rensselaer (Fed.) was elected Speaker with 58 votes against 46 for William Ross (Dem.-Rep.). James Van Ingen (Fed.) was again elected Clerk of the Assembly with 57 votes against 46 for John F. Bacon (Dem.-Rep.).

Although the Democratic-Republicans had a small majority on joint ballot, and should have supported the party's caucus nominee, the Madisonians refused to support Clinton. The Assembly nominated Federalist electors (vote: Fed. 58, Clinton 29, Madison 22). The Senate nominated Clintonian electors (vote: Clinton 19, Fed. 9, Madison 4). On November 9, 1812, the Legislature proceeded to a joint ballot and elected the Clintonian ticket with a vote of 74 to 45, the Madisonians cast 28 blank ballots. The 29 electors chosen were: Joseph C. Yates, Simeon De Witt, Archibald McIntyre, John C. Hogeboom, Gurdon S. Mumford, Jacob De La Montagnie, Philip Van Cortlandt, John Chandler, Henry Huntington, John Woodworth, David Boyd, Cornelius Bergen, Joseph Perine, Chauncey Belknap, George Rosecrantz, John Dill, David Van Ness, Robert Jenkins, Michael S. Vandecook, George Palmer Jr., James Hill, William Kirby, Henry Frey Yates, Thomas H. Hubbard, John Russell, James S. Kipp, Jotham Jayne, Jonathan Stanley Jr. and William Burnet. They cast their votes for DeWitt Clinton and Jared Ingersoll.

The Legislature met for the regular session on January 12, 1813; and the Assembly adjourned on April 12, the Senate on April 13.

On January 12, the Federalist majority of the Assembly elected a new Council of Appointment which removed almost all Democratic-Republican office-holders.

On February 2, the Legislature elected Rufus King (Fed.) to succeed John Smith (Dem.-Rep.) as U.S. Senator from New York for a term beginning on March 4, 1813.

On February 10, the Legislature elected Charles Z. Platt (Fed.) to succeed David Thomas (Dem.-Rep.) as New York State Treasurer.

State Senate

Districts
 The Southern District (5 seats) consisted of Kings, New York, Queens, Richmond, Suffolk and Westchester counties.
 The Middle District (7 seats) consisted of Dutchess, Orange, Ulster, Columbia, Delaware, Rockland, Greene and Sullivan counties.
 The Eastern District (8 seats) consisted of Washington, Clinton, Rensselaer, Albany, Saratoga, Essex, Montgomery, Franklin and Schenectady counties.
 The Western District (12 seats) consisted of Herkimer, Ontario, Otsego, Tioga, Onondaga, Schoharie, Steuben, Chenango, Oneida, Cayuga, Genesee, Seneca, Jefferson, Lewis, St. Lawrence, Allegany, Broome, Madison, Niagara, Cortland, Cattaraugus and Chautauqua counties.

Note: There are now 62 counties in the State of New York. The counties which are not mentioned in this list had not yet been established, or sufficiently organized, the area being included in one or more of the abovementioned counties.

Members
The asterisk (*) denotes members of the previous Legislature who continued in office as members of this Legislature. Peter W. Radcliff and Henry Hager changed from the Assembly to the Senate.

Employees
 Clerk: Sebastian Visscher

State Assembly

Districts

 Albany County (4 seats)
 Allegany and Steuben counties (1 seat)
 Broome County (1 seat)
 Cattaraugus, Chautauqua and Niagara counties (1 seat)
 Cayuga County (3 seats)
 Chenango County (3 seats)
 Clinton and Franklin counties (1 seat)
 Columbia County (4 seats)
 Cortland County (1 seat)
 Delaware County (2 seats)
 Dutchess County (6 seats)
 Essex County (1 seat)
 Genesee County (1 seat)
 Greene County (2 seats)
 Herkimer County (3 seats)
 Jefferson County (2 seats)
 Kings County (1 seat)
 Lewis County (1 seat)
 Madison County (3 seats)
 Montgomery County (5 seats)
 The City and County of New York (11 seats)
 Oneida County (5 seats)
 Onondaga County (2 seats)
 Ontario County (5 seats)
 Orange County (4 seats)
 Otsego County (4 seats)
 Queens County (3 seats)
 Rensselaer County (4 seats)
 Richmond County (1 seat)
 Rockland County (1 seat)
 St. Lawrence County (1 seat)
 Saratoga County (4 seats)
 Schenectady County (2 seats)
 Schoharie County (2 seats)
 Seneca County (1 seat)
 Suffolk County (3 seats)
 Sullivan and Ulster counties (4 seats)
 Tioga County (1 seat)
 Washington County (5 seats)
 Westchester County (3 seats)

Note: There are now 62 counties in the State of New York. The counties which are not mentioned in this list had not yet been established, or sufficiently organized, the area being included in one or more of the abovementioned counties.

Assemblymen
The asterisk (*) denotes members of the previous Legislature who continued as members of this Legislature.

Employees
 Clerk: James Van Ingen
 Sergeant-at-Arms: Thomas Donnelly
 Doorkeeper: Benjamin Whipple

Notes

Sources
 The New York Civil List compiled by Franklin Benjamin Hough (Weed, Parsons and Co., 1858) [see pg. 108f for Senate districts; pg. 121 for senators; pg. 148f for Assembly districts; pg. 186f for assemblymen; pg. 325 for presidential election]
 The History of Political Parties in the State of New-York, from the Ratification of the Federal Constitution to 1840 by Jabez D. Hammond (4th ed., Vol. 1, H. & E. Phinney, Cooperstown, 1846; pages 311-322)
 Election result Assembly, Albany Co. at project "A New Nation Votes", compiled by Phil Lampi, hosted by Tufts University Digital Library
 Election result Assembly, Cattaraugus, Chautauqua and Niagara Co. at project "A New Nation Votes"
 Election result Assembly, Cayuga Co. at project "A New Nation Votes"
 Partial election result Assembly, Clinton and Franklin Co. at project "A New Nation Votes" [gives only votes from Clinton Co.]
 Election result Assembly, Columbia Co. at project "A New Nation Votes"
 Election result Assembly, Greene Co. at project "A New Nation Votes"
 Election result Assembly, Herkimer Co. at project "A New Nation Votes"
 Election result Assembly, Jefferson Co. at project "A New Nation Votes"
 Election result Assembly, Kings Co. at project "A New Nation Votes"
 Election result Assembly, Madison Co. at project "A New Nation Votes"
 Election result Assembly, Onondaga Co. at project "A New Nation Votes"
 Election result Assembly, Orange Co. at project "A New Nation Votes"
 Election result Assembly, Queens Co. at project "A New Nation Votes"
 Election result Assembly, Richmond Co. at project "A New Nation Votes"
 Election result Assembly, Schenectady Co. at project "A New Nation Votes"
 Partial election result Assembly, Sullivan and Ulster Co. at project "A New Nation Votes" [gives votes from Sullivan Co.]
 Partial election result Assembly, Sullivan and Ulster Co. at project "A New Nation Votes" [gives votes from Ulster Co.]
 Election result Assembly, Washington Co. at project "A New Nation Votes"
 Election result Senate, Southern D. at project "A New Nation Votes"
 Election result Senate, Middle D. at project "A New Nation Votes"
 Election result Senate, Eastern D. at project "A New Nation Votes"
 Election result Senate, Western D. at project "A New Nation Votes"
 Election result, Speaker at project "A New Nation Votes"
 Election result, Assembly Clerk at project "A New Nation Votes"
 Election result, Council of Appointment at project "A New Nation Votes"

036
1812 in New York (state)
1813 in New York (state)
1812 U.S. legislative sessions